Allenwood may refer to:

 Allenwood, County Kildare, a village in Ireland
 Allenwood G.F.C., a Gaelic football club
 Allenwood, Ontario, Canada 
 Allenwood, Cumbria, England 
 Allenwood, Georgia, see List of places in Georgia (U.S. state) (A–D)
 Allenwood, New Jersey, United States
 Allenwood, Pennsylvania, United States
 Federal Correctional Complex, Allenwood, in Pennsylvania, United States, which includes:
 United States Penitentiary, Allenwood, a high-security facility
 Federal Correctional Institution, Allenwood Medium, a medium-security facility
 Federal Correctional Institution, Allenwood Low, a low-security facility
 Allenwood Farm, a historic farm property in Plainfield, Vermont, United States
 HMAS Allenwood, an Australian World War II minesweeper

See also
Allen Wood (disambiguation)